Q1 or Q-1 may refer to:
 Quarter 1, as in the first quarter of a calendar year or fiscal year
 first quartile in descriptive statistics
 The first quarto, usually meaning the earliest published version, of one of William Shakespeare's works
 Q1 Tower, a residential apartment building in Surfers Paradise, Australia
 DIGITAL Q1, a digital camera model (Fujifilm)
 Q-1 visa, allows individuals traveling to the U.S. to participate in a cultural exchange program
 Quake (video game) 1, a 1996 video game
 Samsung Q1, an Ultra Mobile Personal Computer (UMPC)
 Qualifying 1, or first qualifying in Formula 1
 Quran 1, al fātiḥah the 1st chapter of the Islamic Holy book

Transport

Air 
 Radioplane Q-1, an American experimental unmanned aircraft of the 1950s
 The primary United States Air Force designation for a series of unmanned aerial vehicles built by General Atomics, which includes the MQ-1 Predator and the MQ-1C Warrior

Road 
 Q1 (New York City bus)
 Rossion Q1, a sports car from US car maker 1g Racing/Rossion Automotive

Rail 
 LNER Thompson Class Q1, a class of steam locomotives of the London and North Eastern Railway, UK
 PRR Q1, a steam locomotive of the Pennsylvania Railroad, USA
 SECR Q1 class, a steam locomotive of the South Eastern and Chatham Railway, UK
 SR Q1 class, a steam locomotive of the Southern Railway, UK

See also
1Q (disambiguation)
 QI, a British comedy television quiz